Vladimir Yegorovich Makovsky (26 January (greg.: 7 February) 1846, Moscow – 21 February 1920, Petrograd) was a Russian painter, art collector, and teacher.

Biography
Makovsky was the son of collector, Egor Ivanovich Makovsky, who was one of the founders of the Moscow Art School. Vladimir had two brothers, Nikolay Makovsky and Konstantin Makovsky, and one sister, Alexandra Makovskaya, all of whom were famous painters. Vladimir studied at the Moscow School of Painting, Sculpture, and Architecture. He finished his studies in 1869 and the following year became one of the founding members of the Association of Travelling Art Exhibitions, where his many years of prolific work brought him to a leading position

Makovsky's work was defined by a perpetual humor as well as blatant irony and scorn. During the seventies his paintings dealt primarily with small-town folk. His pictures, "The Grape-juice Seller" (1879), "Fruit-Preserving" (1876) and "The Congratulator" (1878) depict various scenes where the mood is finely conceived and almost laughter-inducing. Other works of his, such as "The Benefactor" (1874) and "The Convict" (1878) are profoundly socially conscious. In them, Makovsky either criticizes the false sympathy of the aristocracy towards the poor, or draws attention to the oppression and persecution by the tsarist gendarmerie. In 1878, he became an academician.

In the eighties, during the time of Russian "democratic" painting, Makovsky produced some of his most valued works. In 1882, he was made professor at the Moscow Art School after the death of Vasili Perov. Some of Makovsky's greatest works of this period include "In the Ante-room of the Court of Conciliation" (1880), "The Released Prisoner" (1882), and "The Collapse of the Bank" (1881). From the end of the 1880s, Makovsky began to produce more gloomy works. Quintessential works of this period include "You Shall Not Go" (1892), and "On the Boulevard" (1888).

In 1894, Makovsky became Rector of the Preparatory school of the Academy of Art. After the First Russian Revolution, he painted "January 9, 1905, on Vasilyev Island" in which he depicts the armed police firing at defenseless people. In another painting "The Sacrifices on the Khodyn Field" in which a thousand people lost their lives during the coronation ceremony in 1896 of Nicholas II, he again stood uncompromisingly on the side of the oppressed people. After the 1917 October Revolution, Makovsky helped carry over the realist traditions to the early stages of Socialist Realism.

Selected paintings

References

 Vladimir Fiala, Russian Painting of the 18th and 19th Centuries, translated by Jean Layton, Artia, 1981

1846 births
1920 deaths
Artists from Moscow
People from Moskovsky Uyezd
Peredvizhniki
Russian male painters
19th-century painters from the Russian Empire
19th-century male artists from the Russian Empire
20th-century Russian male artists
20th-century Russian painters
Full Members of the Imperial Academy of Arts
Moscow School of Painting, Sculpture and Architecture alumni